Cerosterna luteopubens is a species of beetle in the family Cerambycidae. It was described by Maurice Pic in 1925. It is known from Vietnam and India.

References

Lamiini
Beetles described in 1925